José Buenaventura Sepulveda Fernández was a Peruvian Lieutenant Colonel that served the War of the Pacific and was notable for his service at the Battle of Pampa Germania, in which he was killed at the aforementioned battle.

Biography
José Buenaventura Sepúlveda Fernández was born in the Hacienda de la Huaca, Cañete Province, on July 14, 1848 .

At the age of 22 he entered the Military Academy, opting for the cavalry.

The 113th armored cavalry regiment stationed in the city of Tacna bears his name in his honor.

References

1848 births
1879 deaths
Peruvian military personnel of the War of the Pacific
Peruvian Army officers
Peruvian military personnel killed in action
Military personnel killed in the War of the Pacific